Mark Elderkin (born September 27, 1963) is an American entrepreneur who co-founded Gay.com in 1994 with his husband Jeff O. Bennett.  Elderkin served as President of PlanetOut Inc. when the company went public in 2004. He retired from the company in 2006. He founded Gay Ad Network  in 2007, which was named as one of the Inc. 5000 fastest growing private companies in America. 

Elderkin was a child prodigy of the clarinet. He graduated from Haas School of Business with an MBA and Boston University with a BS in Systems Engineering. 

Elderkin lives in Ft. Lauderdale, Florida with his husband Jeff and daughter Chloe.

References

Boston University College of Engineering alumni
American LGBT businesspeople
1963 births
Living people
Haas School of Business alumni
LGBT people from Florida
American company founders
American technology chief executives